The 1997 Players Championship was a golf tournament in Florida on the PGA Tour, held  at TPC Sawgrass in Ponte Vedra Beach, southeast of Jacksonville. It was the 24th Players Championship. 

Steve Elkington led wire-to-wire, with all four rounds in the sixties, to win his second Players at 272 (−16), a record seven strokes ahead of runner-up Scott Hoch. Elkington's previous win was six years earlier in 1991.

In his first Players, 21-year-old Tiger Woods tied for 31st at 289 (+1); two weeks later, he won the Masters by a record margin.

Defending champion Fred Couples finished thirteen strokes back, in a tie for tenth place.

Venue

Eligibility requirements
All winners of PGA Tour events awarding official money and official victory status in the preceding 12 months, concluding with the Bay Hill Invitational and dating from the 1996 Players Championship
The top 125 PGA Tour members from the final 1996 Official Money List
Winners in the last 10 calendar years of The Players Championship, Masters Tournament, U.S. Open, PGA Championship, and NEC World Series of Golf
British Open winners since 1990
Eight players, not otherwise eligible, designated by The Players Championship Committee as "special selections"
Any players, not otherwise eligible, who are among the top 10 money winners from the 1997 Official Money List through the Bay Hill Invitational
To complete a field of 144 players, those players in order, not otherwise eligible, from the 1997 Official Money List through the Bay Hill Invitational

Source:

Field
John Adams, Fulton Allem, Robert Allenby, Billy Andrade, Stuart Appleby, Emlyn Aubrey, Woody Austin, Paul Azinger, Chip Beck, Ronnie Black, Phil Blackmar, Jay Don Blake, Guy Boros, Michael Bradley, Mike Brisky, Mark Brooks, Olin Browne, Brad Bryant, Patrick Burke, Mark Calcavecchia, Jim Carter, Brandel Chamblee, Lennie Clements, Russ Cochran, John Cook, Fred Couples, Ben Crenshaw, John Daly, Robert Damron, Marco Dawson, Glen Day, Scott Dunlap, Joe Durant, David Duval, David Edwards, Joel Edwards, Steve Elkington, Ernie Els, Brad Fabel, Nick Faldo, Brad Faxon, Rick Fehr, Dan Forsman, David Frost, Fred Funk, Jim Furyk, Jim Gallagher Jr., Robert Gamez, Kelly Gibson, Paul Goydos, Wayne Grady, Scott Gump, Jay Haas, Donnie Hammond, Dudley Hart, Nolan Henke, Brian Henninger, Tim Herron, Scott Hoch, Mike Hulbert, John Huston, Peter Jacobsen, Lee Janzen, Steve Jones, Pete Jordan, Jerry Kelly, Tom Kite, Greg Kraft, Neal Lancaster, Bernhard Langer, Tom Lehman, Justin Leonard, Wayne Levi, Davis Love III, Steve Lowery, Sandy Lyle, Andrew Magee, Jeff Maggert, John Maginnes, Doug Martin, Len Mattiace, Billy Mayfair, Blaine McCallister, Scott McCarron, Mark McCumber, Mark McNulty, Rocco Mediate, Phil Mickelson, Larry Mize, Colin Montgomerie, Gil Morgan, John Morse, Larry Nelson, Frank Nobilo, Greg Norman, Mark O'Meara, David Ogrin, Masashi Ozaki, Naomichi Ozaki, Jesper Parnevik, Craig Parry, Corey Pavin, Chris Perry, Kenny Perry, Don Pooley, Nick Price, Dicky Pride, Tom Purtzer, Mike Reid, Lee Rinker, Loren Roberts, Costantino Rocca, Clarence Rose, Hugh Royer III, Scott Simpson, Joey Sindelar, Vijay Singh, Jeff Sluman, Taylor Smith, Craig Stadler, Paul Stankowski, Payne Stewart, Dave Stockton Jr., Curtis Strange, Steve Stricker, Hal Sutton, Tommy Tolles, David Toms, Sam Torrance, Kirk Triplett, Ted Tryba, Bob Tway, Omar Uresti, Grant Waite, Duffy Waldorf, Tom Watson, Brian Watts, D. A. Weibring, Mark Wiebe, John Wilson, Willie Wood, Tiger Woods, Ian Woosnam, Fuzzy Zoeller

Round summaries

First round
Thursday, March 27, 1997

Source:

Second round
Friday, March 28, 1997

Source:

Third round
Saturday, March 29, 1997

Source:

Final round
Sunday, March 30, 1997

References

External links
The Players Championship website

1997
1997 in golf
1997 in American sports
1997 in sports in Florida
March 1997 sports events in the United States